L.M. Elliott is the pen name of Laura Malone Elliott. She was born on September 17, 1957, not far from Washington, DC. She is the award-winning author of more than a dozen young adult novels, including Under a War-Torn Sky (2001), Give Me Liberty (2008),  A Troubled Peace (2009), Da Vinci’s Tiger (2015), Suspect Red (2017), Hamilton and Peggy! A Revolutionary Friendship (2018), Walls (2021), and Louisa June and the Nazis in the Waves (2022).

Biography
Elliott was born in 1957 near Washington, D.C. She graduated from Wake Forest University and holds a master's in journalism from the University of North Carolina at Chapel Hill. She also holds several national literary awards, such as the NCSS/CBC Notable Book in Social Studies, for her works Under a War-Torn Sky, A Troubled Peace, Suspect Red, and Walls, which were also named Bank Street College of Education Best Books along with Hamilton and Peggy! and Flying South. Her book Suspect Red, a 1950s McCarthy-era story of two teenage boys caught up in the Red Scare’s paranoia, was the winner of the 2018 Grateful American Book Prize. Hamilton and Peggy! A Revolutionary Friendship, a biographical novel about the youngest of the Schuyler Sisters, also received a Grateful American Book Prize Honorable Mention that same year.

Elliott was a long-time senior writer for the Washingtonian magazine.

Elliott was twice a finalist for the National Magazine Award and recipient of numerous Dateline awards. She wrote often on children, women's issues, and health, and co-authored two adult nonfiction works during her time as a journalist.

Her historical fiction novels fit the genre of coming of age fiction, featuring teenage protagonists encountering rites of passage.

Elliott has also authored five picture books for children with New York Times best-selling illustrator, Lynn Munsinger, including: Hunter's Best Friend at School, Hunter and Stripe and the Soccer Showdown, and Hunter's Big Sister, and A String of Hearts. Their last illustrated title together, Thanksgiving Day Thanks, was released in January, 2013.

Elliott lives in Fairfax County,  Virginia, and has an adult daughter and son, also professional creative artists. She appears frequently at middle schools and high schools where she speaks with students about writing, research, and the value of reading about history.

Awards
 NCSS/CBC Notable Book in Social Studies (Under a War-Torn Sky)
 Jefferson Cup Honor Book (Under a War-Torn Sky)
 Bank Street College of Education's Best Book (Under a War-Torn Sky)
 Borders' Original Voices Award (Under a War-Torn Sky)
 IRA/Children's Book Council Children's Choice (Hunter's Best Friend at School)
 Bank Street College of Education Best Book (Flying South)
 Joan G. Sugarman Literature Award (Flying South)
 NCSS/CBC Notable (A Troubled Peace)
 Jefferson Cup Overfloweth (Across a War-Tossed Sea)
 IRA Teacher's Choice (Annie, Between the States)
 New York Public Library Book for the Teen Age (Annie, Between the States)
 Grateful American Book Prize (Suspect Red) 
 NCSS/CBC Notable Book in Social Studies (Suspect Red) 
 Bank Street College of Education Best Book (Suspect Red) 
 Grateful American Book Prize Honorable Mention (Hamilton and Peggy! A Revolutionary Friendship)
 Bank Street College of Education Best Book of the Year (Hamilton and Peggy! A Revolutionary Friendship) 
 Bank Street College of Education Best Book (Walls)
 NCSS/CBC Notable (Walls)
 Kirkus 100 Best YA Novels (Walls)
 Kirkus Best YA Historical Fiction (Walls)

Works
 Shattered Dreams: The Story of Charlotte Fedders with Charlotte Fedders (New York: Harper & Row, 1987)
 A to Z Guide to Your Child's Behavior: A Parent's Easy and Authoritative Reference to Hundreds of Everyday Problems and Concerns from Birth to Twelve Years (contributor) (New York: Putnam, 1993)
 Under a War-Torn Sky (New York: Hyperion, 2001)
 Hunter's Best Friend at School (New York: HarperCollins, 2002)<ref>
{{cite book
| first = Laura Malone
| last = Elliott
| title = Hunter's Best Friend at School| url = https://archive.org/details/isbn_9780060002312
| url-access = registration
| publisher = HarperCollins
| date = 2002
| lccn = 2001039816
}}</ref>
 Flying South (New York : HarperCollins, 2003)
 Annie, Between the States (New York: Katherine Tegen Books, 2004)
 Hunter & Stripe and the Soccer Showdown (New York : Katherine Tegen Books, 2005)
 Give Me Liberty (New York: Katherine Tegen Books, 2006)
 Hunter's Big Sister (New York: Katherine Tegen Books, 2007)
 A Troubled Peace (New York: Katherine Tegen Books, 2009)
 A String of Hearts (New York: Katherine Tegen Books, 2010)
 Thanksgiving Day Thanks (New York: Katherine Tegen Books, 2013)
 Across a War-Tossed Sea (New York: Disney-Hyperion, 2014)
 Da Vinci's Tiger (New York: Katherine Tegen Books, 2015)
 Suspect Red (Los Angeles: Disney-Hyperion, 2017)
 Hamilton and Peggy! A Revolutionary Friendship (New York: Katherine Tegen Books, 2018) 
 Storm Dog (New York: Katherine Tegen Books, 2020)
 Walls (Chapel Hill: Algonquin, 2021)
 Louisa June and the Nazis in the Waves (New York: Katherine Tegen Books, 2022) 

References

External links
 The author's website
Breaking Down Walls: Disinformation, Lies & the Berlin Wall with "Fall for the Book" (2022)
Laws, Katherine (July 15, 2022). "''Finding Answers in the Past: Laura Malone Elliott (’79) offers young people connections and inspiration in her historical novels that can help them navigate the world today". Wake Forest Magazine.
Q&A with Elliott about Walls at Children's Book Council (2021)
Interview of Elliott about Suspect Red at NEA Today (2017)
 "Fall for the Book" (2009) for educators and students featuring "A Troubled Peace"
Valentine's Day video featuring the author.  Presented by "Reading Rockets", a program of Washington, D.C. Public Television (WETA)

1957 births
Living people
21st-century American novelists
American children's writers
American historical novelists
Journalists from Virginia
Novelists from Virginia
Wake Forest University alumni
UNC Hussman School of Journalism and Media alumni
American magazine journalists
American young adult novelists
American women novelists
Women writers of young adult literature
21st-century American women writers
Women historical novelists
American women non-fiction writers
21st-century American non-fiction writers
20th-century American non-fiction writers
20th-century American women writers